Mersin İdmanyurdu (also Mersin İdman Yurdu, Mersin İY, or MİY) Sports Club; located in Mersin, east Mediterranean coast of Turkey in 1969–70. The 1969–70 season was the third season of Mersin İdmanyurdu (MİY) football team in Turkish First Football League, the first level division in Turkey. They finished fourth which was the best position the team ever obtained.

The team manager was Bülent Giz, one of the famous managers in 1970's Turkish football; and the club president was Mehmet Karamahmet, Çukurova Group's owner. Deputy president was Mahir Turan. Erol Tarhan was general captain. Sadri Usluoğlu who worked as executive for Beşiktaş and national team became general manager of İdmanyurdu. Before the start of the season Kadri Aytaç was the technical advisor and look for foreign transfers. Later he attended in a course in Romania.

Mersin İdmanyurdu has targeted championship in this season. Coach Bülent Giz has written an article to declare their target in the mid-season. He said that if the substitutes had been good enough they hadn'nt been finished first half at third place. His claim remained until the end of the league when the team lost last two matches to average teams and lost the chance to be eligible for European Cups next year.

Pre-season
MİY opened the season on 25.07.1969 in Tarsus. Tevfik Sırrı Gür Stadium was under repairement.
 03.08.1969 – Spor-Toto Cup – MİY-Samsunspor: 1–1. Sunday, 17:00. Mersin. Goals: Temel 62' (Samsun), Osman 74' (MİY).
 10.08.1969 – Spor-Toto Cup – Gençlerbirliği-MİY: 1–1. Sunday, 21:45. 19 Mayıs Stadium, Ankara. Goals: İlhan 7', Turan 37'(o.g.)
 20.08.1969 – Preparation game – Galatasaray-MİY: 0–0. Wednesday, 20:00. Mithatpaşa Stadium, İstanbul. Referees: Hüseyin Maloğlu, Özcan Gürkaynak, Güngör Tunçel. Galatasaray: Nihat, Ekrem, Ali, Muzaffer, Talat, Turan, Mehmet, Feridun (Olcay), Ayhan, Ergün (Bilgin), Uğur. Coach: Kaloperoviç. MİY: Fikret, Halim (B.İbrahim), Alp, Mustafa (Arif), Erol, Cihat, Ali (K.Erol), Tarık (K.İbrahim), Osman, Muharrem.
 24.08.1969 – Preparation game – Bursaspor-MİY: 5–1. Monday, 16:45. Bursa. Referees: Abdi Parlakay, Mehmet Rodoslu, Basri Akkoyunlu. Bursaspor: Osman (Yıldız), Vahit, Haluk (İrfan), İsmail (Müfit), İbrahim, Cengiz (Sırrı), Necati, Ersel (Canan), Mesut (Cemal), Taner (Sinan), Ender. Goals: Ersel 4', Ender 27', Ersel 38, Ender 43', Necati 61'(H). MİY: Fikret (Muradis), Erol, Alp, Mustafa, Nihat, Arif, Ali, Ayhan, Tarık, Osman, Muharrem. Goal: Osman (P).
 Boluspor-MİY: 3–1.
 17.09.1969 – In the first preparation match in their home ground MİY defeated Tarsus İdmanyurdu: 6–0. Goals: Ayhan (3), Muharrem (2) and Arif. In another preparation game Bursaspor defeated MİY 5–1. The first match of the league was also played against Bursa but MİY this time beat them at away game.

1969–70 First League participation
First League was played with 16 teams in its twelfth season, 1969–70. Last two teams relegated to Second League 1970–71. Mersin İY became fourth with 12 wins, and Osman Arpacıoğlu was most scorer player with 6 goals. Mersin İdmanyurdu has fought for second place -which provided eligibility for Fairs Cup- with Eskişehirspor, Altay, and Göztepe; and missed the chance of participation in a European cup.

Results summary
Mersin İdmanyurdu (MİY) 1969–70 First League summary:

Sources: 1969–70 Turkish First Football League pages.

League table
Mersin İY's league performance in First League in 1969–70 season is shown in the following table.

Note: Won, drawn and lost points are 2, 1 and 0. F belongs to MİY and A belongs to corresponding team for both home and away matches.

Results by round
Results of games MİY played in 1969–70 First League by rounds:

First half

Mid-season
Friendly game during half season:
 08.02.1970 – MİY-Fenerbahçe: 2–2. Sunday, 14:15. Tevfik Sırrı Gür Stadium, Mersin. Referees: Mustafa Oğultürk, Mehmet Çetinel, İhsan Büyükgiray. MİY: Javorek, K.İbrahim, Cihat, Mustafa, B.Erol, Arif, Ali, Tarık, Osman, Popescu, Muharrem. Goals: Tarık 37', Osman 85'. Fenerbahçe:  Datcu, Şükrü, Ümran, Nunweiller, Ercan, Levent, Can, Ziya, Abdullah, Nedim, Ogün. Goals: Can 57'(P), Ziya 72'.

Second half

1969–70 Turkish Cup participation
1969–70  Turkish Cup was played for the 8th season as Türkiye Kupası by 30 teams. Two elimination rounds (including one preliminary round) and finals were played in two-legs elimination system. Mersin İdmanyurdu participated in 1969–70  Turkish Cup from the first round and was eliminated at second round by then second division team Kütahyaspor. Kütahyaspor was eliminated at semifinals. Göztepe won the Cup for the 2nd time.

Cup track
The drawings and results Mersin İdmanyurdu (MİY) followed in 1969–70 Turkish Cup are shown in the following table.

Note: In the above table 'Score' shows For and Against goals whether the match played at home or not.

Game details
Mersin İdmanyurdu (MİY) 1969–70 Turkish Cup game reports is shown in the following table.
Kick off times are in EET and EEST.

Source: 1969–70 Turkish Cup pages.

Management

Club management
Mehmet Karamehmet was club president.

Coaching team

1969–70 Mersin İdmanyurdu head coaches:

Note: Only official games were included.

1969–70 squad
Stats are counted for 1969–70 First League matches and 1969–70 Turkish Cup (Türkiye Kupası) matches. In the team rosters four substitutes were allowed to appear, two of whom were substitutable. Only the players who appeared in game rosters were included and listed in the order of appearance.

Sources: 1969–70 season squad data from maçkolik com, Milliyet, and Erbil (1975).

Transfer news from Milliyet:
 Transfers in: Right-back Erol was transferred from Feriköy. Mustafa (İzmirspor). K.İbrahim, Erol, Şener, Cemil, Necati, Yusuf, Mahir (amateur).
 Transfers out: After the end of season, forward Ali went to İstanbulspor, 17.07.1970. Arif (Sakaryaspor), B.İbrahim (Tekirdağspor).

See also
 Football in Turkey
 1969–70 Turkish First Football League
 1969–70 Turkish Cup

Notes and references

Mersin İdman Yurdu seasons
Turkish football clubs 1969–70 season